Saint-André is a brand of French triple crème cow's milk cheese with a powdery white, bloomy skin of mold, in the form of a  cylinder, 6 cm in diameter and 5 cm high. Originally developed and manufactured by the industrial Soulié cheese factory in Villefranche-de-Rouergue, Aveyron, it is now produced in Vire, Calvados.   It has a soft buttery texture, tangy edible rind, and tastes like an intense version of Brie. Cream is added to the cheese during manufacture, and the curing process lasts approximately 30 days.

The fat content of Saint-André is so exceptionally high (about 75%) it can make a white wine taste sour and metallic: a crust of baguette and a light beer or simply a slice of pear are suggested by the manufacturer as better complements.
In September 2016 the brand renewed its logotype and packaging to adopt a more modern design in collaboration with Favoreat design, a Brooklyn-based agency. The new logotype has been hand drawn by Hugo Chevallier. Oaked Chardonnays, which tend to be low in acidity, have been reported to be able to complement Saint-André.

References

French cheeses
Cow's-milk cheeses